Rear End is the only studio album released by American recording artist Mercedes. It was released on June 29, 1999 as planned on No Limit Records and Priority Records. It was produced by Beats By the Pound. Rear End found mild success on the Billboard charts in the United States, but was not as successful as some of their other chart-topping releases during that time, only peaking at #72 on the Billboard 200 and #12 on the Top R&B/Hip-Hop Albums.

One single found success on the charts: "It's Your Thing", which featured Master P, made it to #96 on the Billboard Hot 100, #31 on the Hot R&B/Hip-Hop Singles & Tracks and #4 on the Hot Rap Singles.

"Do You Wanna Ride" was only included on the first edition press of the album and was later taken off due to copyright infringement for the sample(s) not being cleared properly and/or used without permission. A second edition or re-release/re-pressing also exists with that track not appearing on the album the second time around. Future pressings of the album contained 22 tracks unlike the original, first pressing that contains 23 tracks. The samples that were not cleared on the song are as follows: "Nasty Girl" by Vanity 6 & "Mercedes Boy" by Pebbles.

Track listing
"It's Your Thing" - (featuring Master P & Ms. Peaches)
Pussy - (featuring Ghetto Commission)
Talk 2 Me (Skit) 
I Can Tell - (featuring Mac, Jamo & Ms. Peaches)
Hit Em - (featuring Mia X & A-Lexxus)
Kiss Da Cat (Skit) - (featuring 1st Time)
Do You Wanna Ride 
N's Ain't Shit - (featuring Mia X)
Bonnie & Clyde - (featuring Magic)
Pony Ride - (featuring Ms. Peaches, O'Dell & Erica Foxx)
Candle Light & Champagne 
Camouflage - (featuring Mac & Samm)
Stop Playing On My Phone (Skit)
Hush - (featuring Mystikal)
What You Need - (featuring Silkk The Shocker)
Crazy Bout Ya - (featuring Master P & Ms. Peaches)
My Love - (featuring Mr. Serv-On & A-Lexxus)
Free Game - (featuring A-Lexxus & Lil Italy)
Chillin' - (featuring A-Lexxus)
I'm Down - (featuring A-Lexxus)
I Need A Thug - (featuring O'Dell, Popeye & Master P)
You're The Only One - (featuring A-Lexxus)
Talk Dirty To The DJ's

.

Chart positions

References

1999 debut albums
No Limit Records albums
Priority Records albums
Hip hop soul albums